The following television stations broadcast on digital channel 39 in the United States:

 K39EO-D in Crescent City, California, to move to channel 19
 K39GH-D in Quanah, Texas, to move to channel 20
 K39JC-D in Butte, Montana, to move to channel 34
 KHGS-LD in Glenwood Springs, Colorado, to move to channel 27
 W39CV-D in Minocqua, Wisconsin, to move to channel 35

The following stations, which are no longer licensed, formerly broadcast on digital channel 39:
 K39AN-D in New Mobeetie, Texas
 K39DG-D in Trinity Center, California
 K39IU-D in Springfield, Missouri
 K39JS-D in Salt Lake City, Utah
 K39KE-D in Chalfant Valley, California
 K39LV-D in Perryton, Texas
 W39CY-D in Myrtle Beach, South Carolina
 W39DE-D in Cayey, Puerto Rico
 WBCF-LD in Florence, Alabama
 WMLD-LD in Brownsville, Florida
 WUDM-LD in Wolcott, Indiana

References

39 digital